John Guthrie  was a 15th-century Scottish bishop, who was sometime Bishop of Ross, an office based at Fortrose on the Black Isle in Ross.

He received papal provision to the vacant bishopric of Ross by papal bull on 11 April 1492, his proctor paying the papacy the 600 gold florins on 14 June. Earlier, at some point between 12 May 1490, and 26 February 1492, he had been admitted to the temporalities of that episcopal see, presumably as bishop-elect.

One early modern authority  who may have seen lost sources claimed that Guthrie had died before July 1494, though no successor to the dioceseis known until 10 September 1497.

Notes

References
 Dowden, John, The Bishops of Scotland, ed. J. Maitland Thomson, (Glasgow, 1912)
 Watt, D. E. R., Fasti Ecclesiae Scoticanae Medii Aevi ad annum 1638, 2nd Draft, (St Andrews, 1969)

Bishops of Ross (Scotland)
15th-century Scottish Roman Catholic bishops
15th-century births
1490s deaths